Henricks is a surname. Notable people with the surname include:
 Jon Henricks (born 1935), Australian swimmer
 Terence T. Henricks (born 1952), American astronaut
 Nate Henricks (born 1987), songwriter, producer, and visual artist
 Nelson Henricks (born 1963), Canadian artist
 Robert Henricks (born 1943), American theologian
 Thomas S. Henricks, American academic

See also
 Henrick